Newvalley is a hamlet on the Isle of Lewis in the Outer Hebrides, Scotland. Newvalley is within the parish of Stornoway. The remains of the Priest's Glen stone circle are to the north of the settlement.

References

External links

Scottish Places - New Valley (An Gleann Ur)

Villages in the Isle of Lewis